Criteria is an indie rock band from Omaha, Nebraska, formed in 2003 when ex-Cursive founding member Steve Pedersen returned to his hometown after graduating from the Duke University School of Law. He spent six months in a friend's basement where he wrote all ten songs for his new project's debut album. He recruited the help of some old friends, A.J. Mogis (of Presto! Recording Studios and Lullaby for the Working Class) on bass guitar, Aaron Druery on guitar, and Mike Sweeney of Beep Beep on drums.  Their first album, En Garde, was released on his previous band's label, Initial Records.

Steve Pedersen worked as a lawyer, making it hard for the band to promote their album. Initial Records went bankrupt about a year after, leaving Criteria without a label. Saddle Creek Records took their longtime friend in and put out three releases in 2005. The first was a re-release of the LP En Garde, their new single, "Prevent the World," and their second full-length, When We Break.  After signing with Saddle Creek, Pedersen quit his day job to spend full-time making music and touring.

Criteria has performed with bands such as Cursive, The Fall of Troy, Thunderbirds Are Now!, Statistics, Poison the Well, Rahim (band), and Minus the Bear.

The band performed at the Maha Musical Festival on August 17, 2013 in Omaha, Nebraska.  Criteria's most recent performance took place on December 12, 2013 at the Waiting Room Lounge in Omaha, during which Pedersen mentioned the band was working on a new album.

Band members
Steve Pedersen - vocals, guitar
A.J. Mogis - backup vocals, bass guitar
Aaron Druery - backup vocals, guitar
Mike Sweeney - drums

Discography

Albums
En Garde (2003 · Initial Records) re-released 2005 on Saddle Creek Records
When We Break (2005 · Saddle Creek Records)
Years (2020 · 15 Passenger)

Singles and EPs
"Prevent the World" single (2005 · Saddle Creek Records)

Compilations
Lagniappe: A Saddle Creek Benefit for Hurricane Katrina (2005 · Saddle Creek Records)
song: "Booketa"

Videography
"Prevent the World" (2 versions, August 2005, directed by Jason Kulbel)
"Good Luck" (March 2006), directed by Shafei and Levitz
"Kiss the Wake" (March 2006, directed by Jaime O’Bradovich, Saddle Creek Music Video Competition at the Hot Shops Film Festival winner, runners-up: Luke Rustermier and Michael McClendon)

See also
Beep Beep
Cursive
Lullaby for the Working Class
The Nein
The White Octave

References

External links
15 Passenger
Criteria official website (site now down)

Criteria on MySpace
Saddle Creek Records
Lazy-i Interview: June 2003
Lazy-i Interview: May 2005
Video Interview with Steve Pedersen of Criteria
Interview from Alternative Press 184 (2003)
Interview from Alternative Press 207 (2005)
Soundcrank Podcast Hosted by Criteria

Indie rock musical groups from Nebraska
Musical groups from Omaha, Nebraska
Musical groups established in 2003
Saddle Creek Records artists